The fraternal squirrel (Sundasciurus fraterculus) is a species of rodent in the family Sciuridae. It is endemic to Indonesia, found only in the Mentawai Archipelago (Siberut, Sipora, North and South Pagai islands), located off the west coast of Sumatra.

References

Thorington, R. W. Jr. and R. S. Hoffman. 2005. Family Sciuridae. pp. 754–818 in Mammal Species of the World a Taxonomic and Geographic Reference. D. E. Wilson and D. M. Reeder eds. Johns Hopkins University Press, Baltimore.

Fraternal
Endemic fauna of Indonesia
Rodents of Indonesia
Vulnerable fauna of Asia
Mentawai Islands Regency
Fraternal squirrel
Fraternal squirrel
Taxonomy articles created by Polbot